Dalibor Večerka (born 12 March 2003) is a Czech footballer who currently plays as a defender for Sparta Prague B, on loan from Opava.

Career statistics

Club

Notes

References

2003 births
Living people
Czech footballers
Czech Republic youth international footballers
Association football defenders
Czech First League players
Czech National Football League players
SFC Opava players
AC Sparta Prague players